Leninsky Okrug may refer to:
Leninsky Okrug, Kaluga, a division of the city of Kaluga, Russia
Leninsky Administrative Okrug, Murmansk, a division of the city of Murmansk, Russia
Leninsky Administrative Okrug, Omsk, a division of the city of Omsk, Russia
Leninsky Administrative Okrug, Tyumen, a division of the city of Tyumen, Russia